Robert Joseph Sexton is an American director, producer, writer, and former musician, best known for his work on music videos and with virtual reality. He has won three Emmy awards for his work as a producer and has been recognized by critics worldwide for his work as a director.

Early life
Robert Joseph Sexton was born in St. Louis, Missouri. When Robert was a baby, Sexton's family moved to New Brunswick, New Jersey, as New Jersey was the home of Robert's maternal grandmother. His mother, uncle, and maternal grandmother and grandfather were Holocaust survivors from Lithuania who had been forced into a concentration camp by the Nazis.

Sexton obtained a degree from Middlesex College, in business and marketing. Sexton then attended the School of Visual Arts in New York City. He also obtained a film and television production certificate from LACC.

Career

Music
As a teenager, Sexton joined the band Genöcide and played with them for seven years, under the stage name Rock 'n' Roll Bobb Sexton. The band was fronted by vocalist Bobby Ebz, noted for spending GG Allin's final day with him. The drummer for Genöcide was Brian "Brain Damage" Keats, and Pete "Damien" Marshall joined Genöcide and played second guitar shortly before the band broke up. During the years Sexton played with the band, they released the albums Reign of Terror and Guttercat. The band's breakthrough album was Submit to Genöcide, which was engineered by Al Theurer, who also worked with Wendy O. Williams, Joan Jett, and Carly Simon.

Sexton then founded the band One Bad Eye, who he played with for three years. One Bad Eye put out their self-titled debut album One Bad Eye in 1993. The album was engineered by Mark Pakucko, who also worked with Dinosaur Jr., Frank Black, Def Leppard, and Rage Against the Machine.  It was produced by Mark Christian, who produced albums by Cher, The Supremes, and Steve Perry. Sexton also played with the bands Undesirables and Pound of Flesh, for three years and two years, respectively.

Music videos
Sexton started his career in Los Angeles as a film editor. Meeting director Brian Smith in an editing bay, he was offered a job as a production manager. Becoming a producer, he produced major music videos for country artists including Toby Keith, Reba McEntire, Brad Paisley, and Clint Black; rock artists including Marilyn Manson, OK Go, and John Fogerty; hip-hop artists like Busta Rhymes; and Christian artists including Skillet, KJ-52, and ZOEgirl.

Sexton then moved largely into directing. One of his videos for Incite, which premiered on The Wall Street Journal, was the first ever narrative-driven heavy metal virtual reality video. In his career, he has directed many music videos for bands including Soulfly for Unleash, The Devil Wears Prada for Sailor's Prayer, and Cavalera Conspiracy for Killing Inside.

Virtual reality
Sexton's entrance into the world of virtual reality was with his creation of "cinematic virtual reality", the technique of blending together traditional film techniques with virtual reality. His most notable work in this realm is his short Psycho City, TX.

Psycho City, TX was released on Sexton's app HollywoodAsylumVR and premiered at VRLA. Sexton described the medium as being good for horror for its realism. He told LA Weekly in May 2018, "Your brain thinks it's a real event that's happening and remembers it as something real. It's not like watching a TV screen or a movie screen. You're in there, you know, it's a hot environment; your brain is thinking this is real."

Personal life
Sexton lives and works in the Hollywood Dell neighborhood of Hollywood, California. He has been married to makeup artist Suzi Hale since June 5, 2010.

The wedding of Suzi Hale and Robert Joseph Sexton was held at the Psycho House on the Universal Studios Backlot, the first and only wedding to ever be held there. The wedding needed to officially be approved by the Alfred Hitchcock Foundation. Director Brian Smith was the best man at Sexton's wedding, and the wedding was attended by friends including author Kim Gruenenfelder.

Frequently referred to as Thee Good Reverend, Sexton was ordained as a minister of the Universal Life Church in 1994.

Public service 
In 2018, Sexton was appointed Block Captain of the Hollywood Dell Neighborhood Watch. In 2021, Sexton joined the publicly-elected Hollywood United Neighborhood Council as a Business Representative, subsequently becoming a board member of their Social Services & Homelessness Committee.

Politics 
Sexton was formerly registered as a member of the Democratic Party, but left the party over its perceived failures to tackle crises like homelessness and crime. Continuing to vote in the party's presidential primaries, Sexton supported Bernie Sanders in 2016 and Tulsi Gabbard in 2020.

On July 31, 2019, Sexton announced an independent run for California State Assembly, in order to represent the 43rd District. Alongside the primary issue of homelessness, his challenge to incumbent Laura Friedman was largely focused on the issues of supporting rent stabilization and opposing the results of 2014 and 2016 California ballot measures Proposition 47 and Proposition 57. Sexton placed third in the primary on March 3, 2020. In a statement given to the Los Angeles Times on March 5, Sexton stated that he was disappointed by the results but hoped to have "started important conversations and changed the dialogue."

Filmography

Music videos

Virtual reality

Other media

Awards and nominations

References

Year of birth missing (living people)
Living people
Virtual reality